The Yale Bridge or Lewis River Bridge spans the Lewis River near Yale, Washington. It was built in 1932 by Cowlitz and Clark counties.

The bridge was designed by Harold H. Gilbert of the Washington State Highway Department, and was constructed by the Gilpin Construction Company of Portland, Oregon. The only short-span steel suspension bridge in Washington, the bridge incorporates unique features. The approach spans were originally supported from below by a timber structure. The cables are discontinuous at the towers, unlike most suspension bridges, in which the cables run over a saddle on the towers. With less wear, the cables could be smaller. The bridge deck is made of timbers with an asphalt overlay. The counties transferred the bridge to the Washington State Department of Highways in the late 1930s and it was refitted in 1957–58 with steel approach spans. It is noted for prominent brackets supporting osprey nests.

The bridge was placed on the National Register of Historic Places on July 16, 1982.

See also
List of bridges documented by the Historic American Engineering Record in Washington (state)
List of bridges on the National Register of Historic Places in Washington (state)

References

External links

Yale Bridge at Clark County, Washington

Road bridges on the National Register of Historic Places in Washington (state)
Bridges completed in 1932
Suspension bridges in Washington (state)
Transportation buildings and structures in Cowlitz County, Washington
Bridges in Clark County, Washington
National Register of Historic Places in Clark County, Washington
National Register of Historic Places in Cowlitz County, Washington
Steel bridges in the United States